Jim Burt (June 22, 1918 – July 5, 1993) was an American broadcast pioneer who spent forty years as sportscaster on KELO radio and television.  He was named South Dakota's sportscaster of the year seven times.

Biography
Jim Burt was born in Melcher, Iowa, on June 22, 1918.  He graduated from Melcher High School in 1936 and then from Brown Institute in Minneapolis, Minnesota.  Burt started broadcasting sports for KELO in June 1947.  He broadcast every boys basketball tournament from 1948 to 1982, and was "the voice of the Coyotes" from 1952 to 1977.

Jim Burt joined South Dakota's first television station, KELO-TV in Sioux Falls, South Dakota, when the station first went on the air in 1953.  He served as the station's sports director.  Burt retired in 1987.

In December 1994, an endowed scholarship fund was established in Jim Burt's memory within the University of South Dakota Foundation.  The scholarship was called the "Jim Burt Memorial Scholarship for Broadcast Journalism Endowment."

Jim Burt died in Sioux Falls, South Dakota, on July 5, 1993, at the age of 75.

External links
Jim Burt's profile at the South Dakota Sports Hall of Fame website
Jim Burt Memorial Scholarship page at the University of South Dakota website
Obituary

1918 births
1993 deaths
People from Marion County, Iowa
South Dakota television reporters
Sportspeople from Sioux Falls, South Dakota
Journalists from South Dakota
20th-century American journalists
American male journalists